The Christian College National Invitational Tournament is an annual men's college basketball post-season tournament. First played in 2012, the tournament is hosted by Oakland City University located in Oakland City, Indiana.

See also 

 Association of Christian College Athletics
 Bible College NIT
 National Christian College Athletic AssociationTrinity College of Florida
 United States Collegiate Athletic Association

References

External links 
 CCNIT home

Basketball competitions in the United States